Census Division No. 10 of Newfoundland and Labrador is composed of the Labrador region of the province, excluding Nunatsiavut. It has a land area of 199,703 km² (77,105.8 sq mi) and at the 2016 census had a population of 24,639, up from 24,111 in 2011. Its two major population centres are the towns of Happy Valley-Goose Bay and Labrador City.

Demographics 

Towns
 Cartwright
 Charlottetown
 Forteau
 Happy Valley-Goose Bay
 Labrador City
 L'Anse-au-Clair
 L'Anse-au-Loup
 Mary's Harbour
 North West River
 Pinware
 Port Hope Simpson
 Red Bay
 St. Lewis
 Wabush
 West St. Modeste

Unorganized subdivisions
 Subdivision A (Includes: L'Anse-Amour, Capstan Island)
 Subdivision B (Includes: Lodge Bay, Paradise River, Black Tickle, Norman's Bay, Pinsent's Arm, William's Harbour)
 Subdivision C (Includes: Sheshatshiu, Mud Lake)
 Subdivision D (Includes: Churchill Falls)
 Subdivision E (Includes: Natuashish)

References

Sources

10
Labrador